Philip Edward Hartman (September 24, 1948 – May 28, 1998) was a Canadian-American actor, comedian, screenwriter and graphic designer. Hartman was born in Brantford, Ontario, Canada, and his family moved to the United States when he was ten years old. After graduating from California State University, Northridge with a degree in graphic arts, he designed album covers for bands including Poco and America. In 1975, he joined the comedy group the Groundlings, where he helped Paul Reubens develop his character, Pee-wee Herman. Hartman co-wrote the film Pee-wee's Big Adventure and made recurring appearances as Captain Carl on Reubens' show Pee-wee's Playhouse.

In 1986, Hartman joined the NBC sketch comedy show Saturday Night Live (SNL) as a cast member, and stayed for eight seasons until 1994. Nicknamed "Glue" for his ability to hold the show together and help other cast members, he won a Primetime Emmy Award for his SNL work in 1989. He also starred as Bill McNeal in the sitcom NewsRadio, voiced Lionel Hutz and Troy McClure on The Simpsons, and appeared in supporting roles in the films Houseguest, Jingle All the Way, and Small Soldiers.

After two divorces, Hartman married Brynn Omdahl in 1987, with whom he had two children. Their marriage was troubled due to Brynn's  drug and alcohol abuse. In 1998, while Phil was sleeping in his bed, Brynn shot and killed him, and later committed suicide. In the weeks following his murder, Hartman was celebrated in a wave of tributes. Dan Snierson of Entertainment Weekly wrote that Hartman was "the last person you'd expect to read about in lurid headlines in your morning paper ... a decidedly regular guy, beloved by everyone he worked with". He was posthumously inducted into the Canada and Hollywood Walks of Fame in 2012 and 2014.

Early life

Hartman was born Philip Edward Hartmann (later dropping one "n") on September 24, 1948, in Brantford, Ontario. He was the fourth of eight children of Doris Marguerite (née Wardell; July 17, 1919 – April 15, 2001) and Rupert Loebig Hartmann (November 8, 1914 – April 30, 1998), who sold  building materials. The family was Catholic. As a child, Hartman found affection hard to earn: "I suppose I didn't get what I wanted out of my family life, so I started seeking love and attention elsewhere."

Hartman was 10 when his family moved to the United States. They first lived in Lewiston, Maine, then Meriden, Connecticut, and then on the West Coast, where he attended Westchester High School and frequently acted as the class clown. After graduating, he studied art at Santa Monica City College, dropping out in 1969 to become a roadie with a rock band. He returned to school in 1972 to study graphic arts at California State University, Northridge. He developed and operated his own graphic art business, creating more than 40 album covers for bands including Poco and America, as well as advertising and the logo for Crosby, Stills & Nash. In the late 1970s, he made his first television appearance on an episode of The Dating Game, where he won.

Career

Early career (1975–1985)
Working alone as a graphic artist, Hartman frequently amused himself with "flights of voice fantasies". In 1975, seeking a more social outlet for his talents, he began attending evening comedy classes by the California-based improvisational comedy group The Groundlings. While watching one of their performances, he impulsively decided to climb on stage and join the cast. His first onscreen appearance was in 1978's Stunt Rock, an Australian film directed in Los Angeles by Brian Trenchard-Smith. After several years of training, paying his way by redesigning the group's logo and merchandise, Hartman formally joined The Groundlings and by 1979 was one of the show's stars.

There Hartman befriended Paul Reubens, with whom he often collaborated on comedic material. Together they created the character Pee-wee Herman and developed The Pee-wee Herman Show, a live stage show that subsequently aired on HBO in 1981. Hartman played Captain Carl in the show, and reprised the role for the children's TV show Pee-wee's Playhouse. Reubens and Hartman made cameos in the 1980 film Cheech and Chong's Next Movie. Hartman co-wrote the script of the 1985 feature film Pee-wee's Big Adventure and had a cameo role as a reporter. He had considered quitting acting at the age of 36 due to the challenges of finding work; but the success of Pee-wee's Big Adventure changed his mind. After a creative disagreement with Reubens, he left the Pee-Wee Herman project to pursue other roles.

Hartman took more small roles in 1986 films such as Jumpin' Jack Flash and Three Amigos. He also worked as a voice actor in animated television programs, including The Smurfs, Challenge of the GoBots, The 13 Ghosts of Scooby-Doo, and in Dennis the Menace as characters Henry Mitchell and George Wilson. He developed a strong persona providing voice-overs for advertisements.

Saturday Night Live (1986–1994)

Hartman successfully auditioned to join NBC's variety show Saturday Night Live (SNL) in its 12th season, which began on October 11, 1986. He had been recommended for the show by fellow Groundlings and SNL cast members Jon Lovitz, and Laraine Newman as well as Jumpin' Jack Flash director Penny Marshall. He told the Los Angeles Times, "I wanted to do [SNL] because I wanted to get the exposure that would give me box-office credibility so I can write movies for myself." In his eight seasons with the show Hartman became known for his impressions, and performed as over 70 different characters. Hartman's original SNL characters include Eugene, the Anal Retentive Chef and Unfrozen Caveman Lawyer. His impressions include Frank Sinatra, Ronald Reagan, Ed McMahon, Barbara Bush, Charlton Heston, Kelsey Grammer, Michael Caine, Oliver Stone, Phil Donahue, Telly Savalas, Barry Humphries, Kirk Douglas and Bill Clintonthe latter considered his best-known impression.

Hartman first performed his Clinton impression on an episode of The Tonight Show. When he met Clinton in 1993, Hartman remarked, "I guess I owe you a few apologies", adding later that he "sometimes [felt] a twinge of guilt about [his Clinton impression]". Clinton showed good humor and sent Hartman a signed photo with the text: "You're not the president, but you play one on TV. And you're OK, mostly." Hartman copied the president's "post-nasal drip" and the "slight scratchiness" in his voice, as well as his open, "less intimidating" hand gestures. Hartman opted against wearing a larger prosthetic nose when portraying Clinton, as he thought it would be distracting. He instead wore a wig, dyed his eyebrows brighter, and used makeup to highlight his nose. In one of Hartman's sketches as Clinton, the president visits a McDonald's restaurant and explains his economic policies in the metaphor of eating other customers' food. The writers told him that he was not eating enough during rehearsals for the sketch – by the end of the live performance, Hartman had eaten so much he could barely speak.

At SNL, Hartman's nickname of "Glue" was coined by Adam Sandler according to Jay Mohr's book Gasping for Airtime. However, according to You Might Remember Me: The Life and Times of Phil Hartman by Mike Thomas, author and staff writer for the Chicago Sun-Times, the nickname was created by SNL cast member and Hartman's frequent on-screen collaborator Jan Hooks. Hartman was very helpful to other cast members. For example, he aided Hooks in overcoming her stage fright. SNL creator Lorne Michaels explained the name: "He kind of held the show together. He gave to everybody and demanded very little. He was very low-maintenance." Michaels also added that Hartman was "the least appreciated" cast member by commentators outside the show, and praised his ability "to do five or six parts in a show where you're playing support or you're doing remarkable character work". Hartman won the Primetime Emmy Award for Outstanding Writing for a Variety, Music or Comedy Program for SNL in 1989, sharing the award with the show's other writers. He was nominated in the same category in 1987, and individually in 1994 for Outstanding Individual Performance in a Variety or Music Program.

By 1993, almost every cast member who was there during Hartman's first year on SNL had left the show, including Jon Lovitz, Jan Hooks and Dana Carvey. Hartman said he felt "like an athlete who's watched all his World Series teammates get traded off into other directions ... It was hard to watch them leave because I sort of felt we were all part of the team that saved the show." This cast turnover contributed to his leaving the show in 1994. Hartman said he thought it was time to leave because the show was "getting less sophisticated" and his style of humor did not fit with the less intellectual comedy of newer cast members like Adam Sandler. Hartman had originally planned to leave the show in 1991, but Michaels convinced him to stay to raise his profile; his portrayal of Clinton contributed to this goal. Jay Leno offered him the role of his sidekick on The Tonight Show but Hartman opted to stay on SNL. NBC persuaded him to stay on SNL by promising him his own comedy–variety show The Phil Show. He planned to "reinvent the variety form" with "a hybrid, very fast-paced, high energy [show] with sketches, impersonations, pet acts, and performers showcasing their talents". Hartman was to be the show's executive producer and head writer. Before production began, however, the network decided that variety shows were too unpopular and canceled the series. In a 1996 interview, Hartman noted he was glad, as he "would've been sweatin' blood each week trying to make it work". In 1998, he admitted he missed working on SNL, but had enjoyed the move from New York City to Southern California.

NewsRadio (1995–1998)
Hartman became one of the stars of the NBC sitcom NewsRadio in 1995, portraying radio news anchor Bill McNeal. He signed up after being attracted by the show's writing and use of an ensemble cast, and joked that he based McNeal on himself with "any ethics and character" removed. Although the show was critically acclaimed, it was never a ratings hit and cancellation was a regular threat. After the completion of the fourth season, Hartman commented, "We seem to have limited appeal. We're on the edge here, not sure we're going to be picked up or not", but added he was "99 percent sure" the series would be renewed for a fifth season. Hartman had publicly lambasted NBC's decision to repeatedly move NewsRadio into different timeslots, but later regretted his comments, saying, "this is a sitcom, for crying out loud, not brain surgery". He also stated that if the sitcom were cancelled "it just will open up other opportunities for me". Although the show was renewed for a fifth season, Hartman was killed before production began. Ken Tucker praised Hartman's performance as McNeal: "A lesser performer ... would have played him as a variation on The Mary Tyler Moore Shows Ted Baxter, because that's what Bill was, on paper. But Hartman gave infinite variety to Bill's self-centeredness, turning him devious, cowardly, squeamish, and foolishly bold from week to week." Hartman was posthumously nominated for the Primetime Emmy Award for Outstanding Supporting Actor in a Comedy Series in 1998 for his work on NewsRadio, but lost to David Hyde Pierce.

The Simpsons (1991–1998)
Hartman provided the voices for numerous characters on the Fox animated series The Simpsons, appearing in 52 episodes. He made his first appearance in the second season episode "Bart Gets Hit by a Car". Although he was originally brought in for a one-time appearance, Hartman enjoyed working on The Simpsons and the staff wrote additional parts for him. He voiced the recurring characters Lionel Hutz and Troy McClure, as well as Duffman (on one occasion) and several background characters. His favorite part was that of McClure, and he often used this voice to entertain the audience between takes while taping episodes of NewsRadio. He remarked, "My favorite fans are Troy McClure fans." He added "It's the one thing that I do in my life that's almost an avocation. I do it for the pure love of it."

Hartman was popular among the staff of The Simpsons. Showrunners Bill Oakley and Josh Weinstein said they enjoyed his work, and used him as much as possible when working on the show. To give Hartman a larger role, they developed the episode "A Fish Called Selma", which focuses on Troy McClure and expands the character's backstory. The Simpsons creator Matt Groening said that he "took [Hartman] for granted because he nailed the joke every time", and that his voice acting could produce "the maximum amount of humor" with any line he was given. Before his death, Hartman had expressed an interest in making a live action film about Troy McClure. Many of The Simpsons production staff expressed enthusiasm for the project and offered to help. Hartman said he was "looking forward to [McClure's] live-action movie, publicizing his Betty Ford appearances", and "would love nothing more" than making a film and was prepared to buy the film rights himself in order to make it happen.

Other work

Hartman's first starring film role came in 1995's Houseguest, alongside Sinbad. Other films include Greedy, Coneheads, Sgt. Bilko, So I Married an Axe Murderer, CB4, Jingle All the Way, Kiki's Delivery Service, and Small Soldiers, the latter of which is his final theatrically released film. At the same time, he preferred working on television. His other television roles include appearances on episodes of The John Larroquette Show, The Dana Carvey Show, 3rd Rock from the Sun, and the HBO TV film The Second Civil War as the President of the United States. He made a considerable amount of money from television advertising, earning $300,000 for a series of four commercials for the soft drink Slice. He also appeared in advertisements for McDonald's (as Hugh McAttack) and 1-800-Collect (as Max Jerome).

Hartman wrote a number of screenplays that were never produced. In 1986, he began writing a screenplay for a film titled Mr. Fix-It, and completed the final draft in 1991. Robert Zemeckis was signed to produce the film, with Gil Bettman hired to direct. Hartman called it "a sort of a merger of horror and comedy, like Beetlejuice and Throw Momma From the Train", adding, "It's an American nightmare about a family torn asunder. They live next to a toxic dump site, their water supply is poisoned, the mother and son go insane and try to murder each other, the father's face is torn off in a terrible disfiguring accident in the first act. It's heavy stuff, but it's got a good message and a positive, upbeat ending." Zemeckis could not secure studio backing, however, and the project collapsed. Another film idea involving Hartman's Groundlings character Chick Hazard, Private Eye was also canceled. Hartman appeared on David Letterman's Late Night and Late Show 13 times between 1989 and 1996, where he can be seen speaking German fluently.

Style

In contrast to his real-life personality, which was described as "a regular guy and, by all accounts, one of show business's most low-key, decent people", Hartman often played seedy, vain or unpleasant characters as well as comedic villains. He described his standard character repertoire as the "jerky guy" and "the weasel parade", citing Lionel Hutz, Bill McNeal, Troy McClure, and Ted Maltin from Jingle All the Way as examples. Hartman enjoyed playing such roles because he "just want[ed] to be funny, and villains tend to be funny because their foibles are all there to see".

He often played supporting roles, rather than the lead part. He said: "[T]hroughout my career, I've never been a huge star, but I've made steady progress and that's the way I like it" and "It's fun coming in as the second or third lead. If the movie or TV show bombs, you aren't to blame." Hartman was considered a "utility player" on SNL with a "kind of Everyman quality" which enabled him to appear in the majority of sketches, often in very distinct roles. Jan Hooks stated of his work on SNL: "Phil never had an ounce of competition. He was a team player. It was a privilege for him, I believe, to play support and do it very well. He was never insulted, no matter how small the role may have been." He was disciplined in his performances, studying the scripts beforehand. Hooks added: "Phil knew how to listen. And he knew how to look you in the eye, and he knew the power of being able to lay back and let somebody else be funny, and then do the reactions. I think Phil was more of an actor than a comedian." Film critic Pauline Kael declared that "Phil Hartman and Jan Hooks on Saturday Night Live are two of the best comic actors I've ever seen."

Writer and acting coach Paul Ryan noted Hartman's work ethic with his impressions. He assembled a collection of video footage of the figure he was preparing to impersonate and watched this continually until he "completely embodied the person". Ryan concluded that "what made [Hartman's impressions] so funny and spot on was Phil's ability to add that perfect touch that only comes from trial and error and practicing in front of audiences and fellow actors." Hartman described this process as "technical". Journalist Lyle V. Harris said Hartman showed a "rare talent for morphing into... anybody he wanted to be".

Ken Tucker summarized Hartman's comedic style: "He could momentarily fool audiences into thinking he was the straight man, but then he'd cock an eyebrow and give his voice an ironic lilt that delivered a punchline like a fast slider—you barely saw it coming until you started laughing." Hartman claimed that he borrowed his style from actor Bill Murray: "He's been a great influence on me – when he did that smarmy thing in Ghostbusters, then the same sort of thing in Groundhog Day. I tried to imitate it. I couldn't. I wasn't good enough. But I discovered an element of something else, so in a sick kind of way I made myself a career by doing a bad imitation of another comic."

Personal life
Hartman married Gretchen Lewis in 1970 and they divorced in September 1972. He married real estate agent Lisa Strain in 1982, and their marriage lasted three years. Strain told People magazine that Hartman was reclusive off screen and "would disappear emotionally ... he'd be in his own world. That passivity made you crazy." In 1987, Hartman married former model and aspiring actress Brynn Omdahl (born Vicki Jo Omdahl, April 11, 1958 – May 28, 1998), having met her on a blind date the previous year. They had two children, Sean and Birgen Hartman. The marriage had difficulties; she was reportedly intimidated by his success and was frustrated that she could not find any on her own, although neither party wanted a divorce. She was reported to have been jealous and often verbally and/or physically abusive, even sending a letter to his ex-wife, threatening to "rip [Strain's] eyes out" if she spoke to him again. Hartman considered retiring to save the marriage.

Hartman tried to get Brynn acting roles, but she became progressively reliant on alcohol and narcotics, entering rehab several times. On multiple occasions, he removed their children from the household to stay with friends or family because of her drug- and alcohol-fueled outbursts. Because of his close friendship with SNL associate Jan Hooks, Brynn "joked" on occasion Hooks and Hartman were married "on some other level". Brynn had written threatening letters addressed to Hooks, warning her to not get close to her husband, but they appeared to have never even been sent, being discovered in her belongings following her death.

Stephen Root, Hartman's NewsRadio co-star, said few people knew "the real Phil Hartman", as he was "one of those people who never seemed to come out of character," but he nevertheless gave the impression of a family man who cared deeply for his children. Hartman befriended Joe Rogan during his time on NewsRadio and confided his marital problems to him. Rogan said that he encouraged Hartman to divorce Brynn five times, but "[Hartman] loved his kids and didn't want to leave".

Hartman stated in 1997 that, though a non-practicing Catholic, he displayed a sense of religiousness. In his spare time, he enjoyed driving, flying, sailing, marksmanship, and playing the guitar.

Death
On May 27, 1998, Hartman's wife, Brynn, visited the Italian restaurant Buca di Beppo in Encino, California, with producer and writer Christine Zander, who said she was "in a good frame of mind"; they had drinks. After returning home, Brynn and Hartman had a "heated" argument, after which he went to bed. She entered his bedroom some time before  PDT on May 28, 1998, and, as he slept, she fatally shot him once between the eyes, once in the throat, and once in the upper chest with a Charter Arms .38 caliber handgun. He was 49 years old. She was taking Zoloft, had been drinking alcohol, and had recently used cocaine.

Brynn then drove to the home of her friend Ron Douglas and confessed to the killing, but he did not believe her. They drove back to the house in separate cars, and she called another friend and confessed a second time. On seeing Hartman's body, Douglas called 9-1-1 at  Police arrived and escorted Douglas and the Hartmans' two children from the premises, by which time Brynn had locked herself in the bedroom. Shortly afterward, she died from a self-inflicted gunshot.

The police stated Hartman's death was caused by "domestic discord" between the couple. A friend said Brynn "had trouble controlling her anger.... She got attention by losing her temper". A neighbor of the Hartmans told a CNN reporter that the couple had marital problems. Yet actor Steve Guttenberg said they had been "a very happy couple, and they always had the appearance of being well-balanced".

Brynn's brother, Gregory Omdahl, filed a wrongful death lawsuit in 1999 against both Pfizer, the manufacturer of Zoloft, and her child's psychiatrist, Arthur Sorosky, who had provided samples of the antidepressant to Brynn. Phil Hartman's friend and former SNL colleague Jon Lovitz has accused Hartman's then-NewsRadio co-star Andy Dick of reintroducing Brynn to cocaine, causing her to relapse and suffer a nervous breakdown. Dick claims to have known nothing of her condition. Lovitz later said he no longer blamed Dick for Hartman's murder, but in 2006, Lovitz claimed Dick approached him at a restaurant and said, "I put the Phil Hartman hex on you; you're the next one to die." Lovitz then had him ejected from the restaurant. The following year at the Laugh Factory comedy club in Los Angeles, Lovitz and Dick had another argument, with Lovitz slamming Dick's head into the bar. Dick asserted he was not at fault in relation to Hartman's death.

Brynn's sister Katharine Omdahl and brother-in-law Mike Wright raised the two Hartman children. Hartman's will stipulated each child would inherit money over several years after turning 25. In accordance with their wishes, both Hartman's and Brynn's body were cremated by Forest Lawn Memorial Park and Mortuary, Glendale, California, and their ashes were scattered over Santa Catalina Island's Emerald Bay. Also has a headstone in Thief River Falls, MN with Wife Brynn

Response and legacy
NBC executive Don Ohlmeyer stated that Hartman "was blessed with a tremendous gift for creating characters that made people laugh. Everyone who had the pleasure of working with Phil knows that he was a man of tremendous warmth, a true professional and a loyal friend." Guttenberg expressed shock at Hartman's death and Steve Martin said he was "a deeply funny and very happy person". Matt Groening called him "a master" and director Joe Dante said "He was one of those guys who was a dream to work with. I don't know anybody who didn't like him." Dan Snierson of Entertainment Weekly concluded that Hartman was "the last person you'd expect to read about in lurid headlines in your morning paper" and "a decidedly regular guy, beloved by everyone he worked with". In 2007, Entertainment Weekly ranked Hartman the 87th greatest television icon of all time, and Maxim named him the top Saturday Night Live performer of all time.

On the day of Hartman's death, rehearsals for The Simpsons and that night's performance by The Groundlings were canceled. The season five premiere episode of NewsRadio, "Bill Moves On" (aired September 23, the day before what would have been his 50th birthday) finds Hartman's character, Bill McNeal, has died of a heart attack, while the other characters reminisce about his life. Lovitz joined the show, in his place, beginning with the next episode. A special episode of Saturday Night Live commemorating Hartman's work on the show aired on June 13, 1998. Rather than substituting another voice actor, the writers of The Simpsons retired Hartman's characters. His final appearance in the tenth season episode "Bart the Mother" is dedicated to him, as is his final film Small Soldiers.

Hartman was preparing to voice Zapp Brannigan, a character written specifically for him on Groening's second animated series Futurama, at the time of his death. Even though the role was specifically made for him, Hartman still insisted on auditioning and Groening said he "nailed it". After Hartman's death, Billy West took over the role. Though executive producer David X. Cohen credits West with using his own take on the character, West later said that he purposely tweaked Zapp's voice to better match Hartman's intended portrayal. Hartman was planning to appear with Lovitz in the indie film The Day of Swine and Roses, scheduled to begin production in August 1998.

In 2002, Laugh.com and Hartman's brother John published the album Flat TV, a selection of comedy sketches recorded by Hartman in the 1970s, which had been kept in storage. John Hartmann commented: "I'm putting this out there because I'm dedicating my life to fulfilling his dreams. This [album] is my brother doing what he loved." Flat TV was optioned for an animated adaptation by Michael "Ffish" Hemschoot's animation company Worker Studio in 2013. The deal came about after Michael T. Scott, a partner in the company, posted online a handwritten letter he had received from Hartman in 1997, leading to a correspondence between Scott and Paul Hartmann.

A campaign was started on Facebook by Alex Stevens in 2007, and endorsed by Hartman's brother Paul, to have Phil inducted to Canada's Walk of Fame. Among the campaign's numerous publicity events, Ben Miner of the Sirius XM Radio channel Laugh Attack dedicated the month of April 2012 to Hartman. The campaign ended in success and Hartman was inducted on September 22, 2012, to the Walk of Fame, with Paul accepting the award on his late brother's behalf. Hartman was also awarded the Cineplex Legends Award. In June 2013, it was announced that Hartman would receive a star on the Hollywood Walk of Fame, which was unveiled on August 26, 2014. Additionally, a special prize at the Canadian Comedy Awards was named for Hartman. Beginning with the 13th Canadian Comedy Awards in 2012, the Phil Hartman Award was awarded to "an individual who helps to better the Canadian comedy community". In 2015, Rolling Stone magazine ranked Hartman as one of the ten greatest Saturday Night Live cast members throughout the show's forty-year history, coming in seventh on its list of all 141 members.

Filmography

Film

Television

Video games

Theme park attractions

Discography

1974
Poco, Seven
1975
America, History: America's Greatest Hits
1977
America, Harbor
Poco, Legend
1979
America, Silent Letter
1980
Firesign Theatre, Fighting Clowns

References

Book sources

External links

 
 Phil Hartman at Yahoo! Movies
 Phil Hartman at The New York Times
 Hartman's autopsy and death certificate
 Phil Hartman's final night: The tragic death of a “Saturday Night Live” genius, Mike Thomas, Salon, September 21, 2014

1948 births
1998 deaths
1998 murders in the United States
20th-century American male actors
20th-century Canadian male actors
Album-cover and concert-poster artists
American male comedians
American male film actors
American graphic designers
American impressionists (entertainers)
American male screenwriters
American male television actors
American television writers
American male voice actors
American sketch comedians
California State University, Northridge alumni
Canadian male comedians
Canadian emigrants to the United States
Canadian male voice actors
Canadian murder victims
Canadian sketch comedians
Deaths by firearm in California
Male actors from Los Angeles
American male television writers
Murder–suicides in California
Naturalized citizens of the United States
Writers from Brantford
People murdered in Los Angeles
Primetime Emmy Award winners
Santa Monica College alumni
Comedians from California
Mariticides
Westchester High School (Los Angeles) alumni
Screenwriters from California
20th-century Canadian comedians
20th-century American comedians
20th-century American male writers
20th-century American screenwriters
Comedians from Ontario
Hanna-Barbera people
Disney people